A list of films produced in the Greenlandic language either by Greelandic or Danish producers, sorted in alphabetical order.

A
 Akornatsinniittut – Tarratta Nunaanni (2017)
 Anori (2018)
 Aqqalu (2011)

E
 Eksperimentet (2010)

G
 Godnat - Sinilluarit (1999)

H
 Hinnarik Sinnattunilu (2009)

L
 Le Voyage D'Inuk (2009)

M
 Matup Tunuani (2015)

N
 Narsaq - ung by i Grønland (1979)
 Nâlagkersuissut okarput tássagôk (1973)
 Nuummioq (2009)

P
 Palos brudefærd (1934)

Q
 Qaamarngup uummataa (1998)
 Qaqqat Alanngui (2011)
 Qivitoq (1956)

S
  (2014)

U
Unnuap Taarnerpaaffiani (2014)
Uuttoq - Kaali på sælfangst (1985)

Non Greenlandic-language films shot in Greenland
Smilla's Sense of Snow (1997)

See also
 List of Greenlandic films of 2014
 List of Greenlandic submissions for the Academy Award for Best Foreign Language Film

References

External links
 Greenland film at the Internet Movie Database

Greenland

Films